Mannes School of Music  is a music conservatory in The New School, a private research university in New York City. In the fall of 2015, Mannes moved from its previous location on Manhattan's Upper West Side to join the rest of the New School campus in Arnhold Hall at 55 W. 13th Street.

History 

Originally called The David Mannes Music School, it was founded in 1916 by David Mannes, concertmaster of the New York Symphony Orchestra, and his wife Clara Damrosch, sister of Walter Damrosch, then conductor of that orchestra, and Frank Damrosch. The Damrosch and Mannes families were perhaps the most important music families in America at that time, with David Mannes emerging as one of the first American born violin recitalists to achieve significant status. David Mannes was the director of the Third Street Music School Settlement as well as founder of Colored Music Settlement School, all prior to founding the Mannes School. The school was originally housed on East 70th Street (later occupied by the Dalcroze School).

A larger campus was created out of four converted brownstones beginning at 157 East 74th Street, in Manhattan's Upper East Side. After 1938, the school was known as the Mannes Music School in recognition of the broader course of study that expanded the school well beyond that of a community music school, including the three-year Artist Diploma. When Clara died in 1948, their son Leopold Mannes became president, endowing the school with his fortune from co-inventing Kodachrome film. In 1953 the school began offering a bachelor of science degree and changed its name to the Mannes College of Music. In 1960 it merged with the Chatham Square Music School. In 1984 the school moved to larger quarters on West 85th Street.  In 1989 Mannes joined The New School. In 2005, the New School administration changed the name to Mannes College: the New School for Music. In 2015, the university renamed it Mannes School of Music, and moved it to Arnhold Hall in the West Village. It is now part of the College of Performing Arts at The New School, which also includes the School of Drama and the School of Jazz and Contemporary Music. The College of Performing Arts, including Mannes Prep, has a total of 1,450 students. The students in any of the three schools of the College of Performing Arts can take courses in the three schools (Drama, Jazz, Mannes), no matter which school they are directly enrolled in, expanding the opportunities for self-directed study.

Academics 
Two academic divisions constitute the conservatory:
 College: the academic spine of the school, conferring undergraduate and graduate degrees and diplomas
 Preparatory: pre-college training for children and adolescents

The Techniques of Music program is the foundation for academic musical study in the two divisions at Mannes, encompassing the range of elementary to advanced music theory and aural skills and analysis classes.

Music theory was taught at Mannes from its inception, with David Mannes hiring important figures such as Ernest Bloch and Rosario Scalero to teach theory and composition. in 1931 Hans Weisse was hired, one of the leading students of Heinrich Schenker. Over the following nine years, Weisse promoted not just the study of Schenkerian analysis but the incorporation of it into the musical life of the school, including performance and composition.  Because of his association with the school, Schenker's publication Five Graphic Music Analyses (Fünf Urlinie-Tafeln) was published jointly by his regular publisher, Universal Edition and the David Mannes School in 1932.

In 1940, Weisse died unexpectedly and was replaced by Felix Salzer.  Salzer, also a student of Schenker, built upon Weisse's foundation by reorganizing the theory program into the Techniques of Music department.  The philosophy behind this move was and is to integrate musicianship, theory, and performance, which was based on Schenker's concept of the role of theory in tonal music. Salzer's leading student, Carl Schachter, as well as his students, continued and strengthened the department.

Today the Mannes program is rapidly evolving and expanding in both the study of performance and theory. Mannes has revised its curriculum to include the incorporation of music technology classes, improvisation ensembles, teaching artistry, arts journalism, film music composition, creative entrepreneurship and more, all tied to a new commitment to contemporary music well beyond the tonal-based approach of Schenker. The Mannes of today includes an ever-increasing number of programs in partnership with its sister conservatory, School of Jazz.

Notable people

College faculty 

Michael Bacon – film composition
Ernest Bloch – composition
Howard Brockway – piano
William Burden – voice
Semyon Bychkov – conducting
Joseph Colaneri – Director of Opera Program
Anthony Coleman – improvisation
Valerie Coleman – flute, composition
Alfred Cortot – piano
Robert Cuckson – composition, theory, analysis
Mario Davidovsky – composition
Jeremy Denk – piano
Elaine Douvas – oboe
George Enescu – interpretation
Ruth Falcon – voice
Vladimir Feltsman – piano
Lillian Fuchs – violin, chamber music
Felix Galimir – violin, chamber music
Richard Goode – piano
David Hayes – conducting (present Director of Orchestral and Conducting Studies)
Anna Jacobs – Art of Engagement
Charles Kaufman – history, theory, President
Yakov Kreizberg – conducting
William Kroll – violin
Lowell Liebermann – composition, director of the Mannes American Composers Ensemble
Clara Mannes – chamber music
David Mannes – conducting, violin
Leopold Mannes – theory
Bohuslav Martinů – composition
Missy Mazzoli – composition
Frank Miller – cello
Mitch Miller – oboe, English horn
Jessie Montgomery – violinist and composer
David Nadien – violinist
Charles Neidich – clarinet
Paul Neubauer – viola
Orin O'Brien – double bass
Cynthia Phelps – viola
Erik Ralske – horn
Nadia Reisenberg – piano
Lucie Robert – violin
Jerome Rose – piano
Jerome Rothenberg – visual art
Richard Rychtarik – stagecraft
Felix Salzer – theory
Rosario Scalero – solfege, theory, composition
Carl Schachter – theory
George Szell – composition, instrumentation, theory
Terry Teachout – arts journalism
Ronald Thomas – cello, chamber music
Sally Thomas – violin
Roman Totenberg – violin
Rosalyn Tureck – piano
Ronald Turini – piano
William Vacchiano – trumpet
Vladimir Valjarevic – piano
David Van Tieghem – sound design, experimental music
Glen Velez – percussion
Isabelle Vengerova – piano
Stefan Wolpe – composition
Jeffrey Zeigler – cello, chamber music
John Zorn – Curator, The Stone and The Stone Workshops at The New School

Alumni 

Nomi Abadi – composer
Edward Aldwell – pianist and theorist
Burt Bacharach – composer and pianist
Robert Bass – conductor
Jeremy Beck – composer
Johanna Beyer – composer
Semyon Bychkov – conductor
Michel Camilo – pianist and composer
Myung-whun Chung – conductor and pianist
Kvitka Cisyk – opera singer, coloratura soprano
Valerie Coleman – flutist and composer, Imani Winds
Larry Coryell – guitarist
Lee Curreri – film and television composer
Danielle de Niese – lyric soprano
Ezinma – violinist
Bill Evans – pianist and composer
JoAnn Falletta – conductor
Richard Goode – pianist
Mary Rodgers Guettel – composer and philanthropist
Rebekah Harkness – founder of the Harkness Ballet
Eugene Istomin – pianist
Marta Casals Istomin – arts administrator
Jeannette Knoll – opera singer
Yakov Kreizberg – conductor
Gail Kubik – composer
Yonghoon Lee – tenor
Ursula Mamlok – composer
Douglas McLennan – arts journalist, founder of Artsjournal.com
Peter Mendelsund – graphic designer
Charlie Morrow – composer and sound artist
David Nadien – violinist
Hafez Nazeri – composer
Patricia Neway – operatic soprano and musical theatre actress
Anthony Newman – keyboardist
Tim Page – music critic
Charlemagne Palestine – composer
Murray Perahia – pianist
Maurice Peress – conductor
Eve Queler – conductor
Shulamit Ran – composer
Kevin Riepl – composer
Michael Riesman – conductor, composer, keyboardist, Music Director of Philip Glass Ensemble
George Rochberg – composer
Adam Rogers – jazz guitarist
Jerome Rose – piano
Alexandros Kapelis – piano
Beatrice Schroeder Rose - harp
Donald Rosenberg – arts journalist
Julius Rudel – conductor
Carl Schachter – musicologist and theorist
Nadine Sierra – soprano
Lawrence Leighton Smith – conductor
Lara St. John – violinist
Jonathan Tetelman – tenor
Jory Vinikour – harpsichordist
Frederica von Stade – mezzo-soprano
Craig Walsh – composer
Ivan Yanakov – pianist
Jennifer Zetlan – soprano

References

External links

Educational institutions established in 1916
Music schools in New York City
The New School
1916 establishments in New York City